The N-30 or National Highway 30 is a 110 km national highway in Pakistan which extends from Basima to Khuzdar in Balochistan province. It is  maintained and operated by Pakistan's National Highway Authority.

See also 
 Motorways of Pakistan
 Transport in Pakistan

References

External links
 N-30 View
 National Highway Authority

Roads in Pakistan